"Kids" is a song recorded by American pop rock band OneRepublic as the second single from their fourth studio album, Oh My My (2016). The single's title and artwork were officially announced on the band's Twitter account on August 3, 2016. The song was released August 12, 2016 and its music video was released on August 25, 2016. The song was used by Chrysler in their "PacifiKids" 2016 Christmas commercial.

Composition
The song has been described as having a pop rhythm with an "electro" tinge. Ryan Tedder, the lead vocalist of OneRepublic, told Entertainment Weekly that "the song was inspired by the sweeping, 80s-style synthpop of acts like M83".

The song is written in the key of D major with a common time tempo of 100 beats per minute. The vocals span from E3 to F#5 in the song.

Music video
The official music video was released on August 25, 2016, through Vevo. It was directed by Hal Kirkland and produced by Here Be Dragons. The video featured the band members in Mexico City. Views of the Angel of Independence, Soumaya Museum, Palace of Fine Arts, and the Monument to the Revolution were seen in the video. It follows the story of a young couple meeting and attending a OneRepublic concert in an outdoor alleyway. A virtual reality version of the music video, created with the Nokia OZO, was also produced. The music video has currently received more than 84 million views.

Track listing

Charts

Weekly charts

Year-end charts

Certifications

Release date

References

External links

2016 songs
2016 singles
OneRepublic songs
Songs written by Ryan Tedder